Charles Schultz may refer to:
Charles Schultz (American football) (1916–1989), American football player
Charles Schultz (politician) (1858–1928), American politician

See also
Charles M. Schulz (1922–2000), American cartoonist and creator of Peanuts
Charles Schultze (1924–2016), American economist